Moscow Art Trio (established in 1990) is a Russian trio comprising Arkady Shilkloper (French horn & flugelhorn), Misha Alperin (piano & vocals) and Sergey Starostin (vocals, clarinet & folkreeds), performing in the Classical/Jazz/Traditional music genres.

The trio's leader, Mikhail Alperin, also composed its music. He lived near Oslo, Norway since 1993, and became a central figure in new improvised music of the far North, until his death in May 2018. Arkady Shilkloper (horns) is a former member of the Moscow Philharmonic Orchestra, and has also collaborated with the Bolshoi Theater Orchestra. Vocalist Sergey Starostin has always had a great interest in folk tales and music, even while studying classical music. 

The trio has appeared at festivals and musical events around the world.

Discography 
1993  Prayer (Jaro Medien)
1995  Folk Dreams (Jaro Medien)
1996: Hamburg Concert (Jaro Medien)
1998: Live In Karlsruhe (Boheme Music)
1998: Mountain Tale (Jaro Medien), with Angelite (The Bulgarian Voices Angelite) & Huun-Huur-Tu
1998: Music (Jaro Medien), with Hans-Kristian Kjos Sørensen (percussion)
2000: Moscow Art Trio (Boheme Music)
2001: Once Upon A Time (Jaro Medien), with Eli Kristin Hovdsveen Hagen (vocals)
2006: Instead Of Making Children (Jaro Medien)
2008: Village Variations (Jaro Medien), with The Norwegian Chamber Orchestra)
2010  Legend (Jaro Medien) with Angelite (The Bulgarian Voices Angelite) & Huun-Huur-Tu

References

External links 
Puma Official Website

Russian jazz ensembles
Russian experimental musical groups
Musical groups established in 1990
Musical groups from Moscow